Tanabi is a municipality in the northwestern part of the state of São Paulo, Brazil. The population is 26,101 inhabitants (IBGE/2020).
The city is located 447 km from the city of São Paulo and 30 km from São José do Rio Preto. Tanabi was founded on July 4, 1882.

Demographics

Indicators:

Population: 24,055 (IBGE/2010)
Area: 745.8 km2 (166.5 sq mi)
Population density: 32.25/km2 (2,451.5/sq mi)
Urbanization: 90.4% (2010)
Sex ratio (Males to Females): 101.98 (2011)
Birth rate: 11.59/1,000 inhabitants (2009)
Infant mortality: 9.9/1,000 births (2009)
Homicide rate: 6.8/100 thousand ppl
HDI: 0.817 (UNDP/2000)

All indicators are from SEADE and IBGE

Economy

The tertiary sector corresponds to 64.57% of the GDP. The primary sector is 16.55% of Tanabi's GDP and the industry corresponds to 18,88%.

Transportation

 SP-320 - Rodovia Euclides da Cunha
 SP-377 - Rodovia Deputado Bady Bassitt, 16 km to Monte Aprazível

External links
  http://www.tanabi.sp.gov.br Prefecture of Tanabi
  citybrazil.com.br

References

Populated places established in 1924
Municipalities in São Paulo (state)